A list of companies, governmental and quasi-governmental agencies (government-sponsored enterprises), and/or non-profit organizations involved in the various economic and financial crises of 2007–2008.

Housing Bubble

United States

National home construction companies
 Beazer Homes USA
 Hovnanian Enterprises
 Lennar
 KB Home
 NVR, Inc.
 PulteGroup
 Toll Brothers

Real estate and appraisal
 Coldwell Banker
 Prudential Financial

Associations
 American Society of Appraisers
 Appraisal Institute
 National Association of Home Builders
 National Association of Realtors
 Real Estate Counseling Group of America
 Urban Land Institute

Mortgage crisis

Subprime lenders
 New Century Financial Corporation
 American Home Mortgage Investment Corporation
 Accredited Home Lenders
 Countrywide Financial
 Northern Rock (UK)
 Ameriquest
 E-Trade
 Option One
 American Freedom Mortgage, Inc.
 MortgageIT
 NovaStar Financial
 American Equity Mortgage

Other lenders
 Washington Mutual
 Wachovia
 Suntrust
 Luminent Mortgage Capital
 Aegis Wholesale 
 1st National Bank of Arizona
 GreenPoint Mortgage Funding 
 Velocity Commercial Lender
 Fremont Investment & Loan
 ResMAE Mortgage Corp
 Americans Brokers Conduit
 IndyMac Bank
Aurora Loan Services LLC

Insurers
American International Group
Ambac
MBIA
Mortgage Guaranty Insurance Corporation

Secondary and securitized mortgage market

Banks

BNP Paribas, France
JPMorgan Chase, USA
Citigroup, USA
Deutsche Bank, Germany
 IKB Industriekredit-Bank, Germany
Bear Stearns
 Sächsische Landesbank, Germany
Goldman Sachs
Lehman Brothers
Bank of America
Wachovia
Netbank, USA
UBS AG, Switzerland
Northern Rock, United Kingdom
HBOS, United Kingdom
Merrill Lynch ., USA
Washington Mutual Bank
Dexia, Belgium, France
Fortis, Benelux
Royal Bank of Scotland Group, United Kingdom
Lloyds Banking Group, United Kingdom
Glitnir, Iceland
Kaupthing Bank, Iceland
Landsbanki, Iceland

Governmental and quasi-governmental
United States Department of the Treasury
U.S. Securities and Exchange Commission
Federal Housing Finance Agency
State of California
Jefferson County, Alabama
Vallejo, California

Central Banks
Federal Reserve Bank
Federal Reserve Bank of New York
European Central Bank
Bank of Japan
Bank of England
Central Bank of Russia

Credit rating agencies
Moody's
Standard & Poor's
Fitch Ratings

Government sponsored enterprises

Fannie Mae, Federal National Mortgage Association
Freddie Mac, Federal Home Loan Mortgage Corporation

Nonprofit Organization

Community Organization
 ACORN Association of Community Organizations for Reform Now:  accused of involvement

Credit Counselors
 Hope Now Alliance

United States officials' positions
Of the Emergency Economic Stabilization Act of 2008 and its reincarnation as an amendment of H.R. 1424, supporters and opponents:

Supporters
 Henry M. Paulson, Jr., Secretary of the Treasury
 Ben S. Bernanke, Chairman and a member of the Board of Governors of the Federal Reserve System
 George W. Bush, President
 John McCain, U.S. Senator, Arizona, 2008 Republican nominee for U.S. President
 Barack Obama, U.S. Senator, Illinois, 2008 Democratic nominee for U.S. President
 Joseph Biden, U.S. Senator, Delaware, 2008 Democratic nominee for U.S. Vice-president

Non-supporters
 Dr. Ron Paul, U.S. Congressman, Texas District 14, former candidate for Republican nomination for U.S. President
 Chuck Baldwin, 2008 presidential candidate for the Constitution Party
 Cynthia McKinney, 2008 presidential candidate for the Green Party
 Bob Barr, 2008 presidential candidate for the Libertarian Party
 Ralph Nader, 2008 independent presidential candidate
 Raghuram Rajan, 2005-06 Chief Economist, International Monetory Fund

References

2007 in economics
2008 in economics
Great Recession